Richarda Schmeißer (later Richarda Hartmann; born 20 August 1954) is a retired German former gymnast. She competed at the 1972 Summer Olympics in all artistic gymnastics events and won a silver medal with the East German team. Her best personal result was eighth place in the uneven bars. She won three more silver medals at the world championships in 1970 and 1974 (team competition) and at the 1975 European championships (vault).

References

1954 births
Living people
People from Zeitz
People from Bezirk Halle
German female artistic gymnasts
Sportspeople from Saxony-Anhalt
Olympic gymnasts of East Germany
Gymnasts at the 1972 Summer Olympics
Olympic silver medalists for East Germany
Olympic medalists in gymnastics
Medalists at the 1972 Summer Olympics
Medalists at the World Artistic Gymnastics Championships
Recipients of the Patriotic Order of Merit in bronze
20th-century German women